The Bielschowsky technique is a silver staining method used in histochemistry for the visualization of nerve fibers, including multipolar interneurons in the cerebellum.

The method is attributed to German neurologist and neurohistologist Max Bielschowsky (1869–1940), who made improvements over the previous method developed by Ramon y Cajal (1852–1934).

See also
 Immunohistochemistry
 Luxol fast blue stain
 Neurofilament

References

Staining
Histochemistry
Histology